Cyphellostereum brasiliense is a species of basidiolichen in the family Hygrophoraceae. Found in Brazil, it was formally described as a new species in 2010 by Norwegian mycologist  Leif Ryvarden. The type specimen was collected in São Paulo, where it was found growing on dead mosses. The species has a rounded to slightly spoon-shaped cap, and club-shaped basidia measuring 18–25 by 5–6 μm with oblong to ellipsoid basidiospores measuring 7–8 by 3.5–4.5 μm.

References

Hygrophoraceae
Lichen species
Lichens described in 2010
Lichens of Southeast Brazil
Taxa named by Leif Ryvarden
Basidiolichens